"Turn" is the fourth single from Scottish rock band Travis's second studio album, The Man Who (1999). The single peaked at number eight on the UK Singles Chart and reached number two in Scotland, number 28 in Ireland and number 37 in New Zealand.

Music video
Two music videos were shot for the single. The first video, included on the group's Singles DVD, features Fran Healy engaged in a push-up contest. This video was filmed in Hackney on the Nightingale Estate. The estate has since been demolished. British actress Julie Smith as well as British actor Stephen Graham were featured in the video. The second featured a staged performance by the band.

B-sides
The release of the single was accompanied by a cover of Britney Spears's hit single "...Baby One More Time". Spears herself heard the Travis version while shopping, and commented by saying it was 'a total shock' and was 'a very good cover'.

Track listings

 UK CD1
 "Turn"
 "River"
 "Days of Our Lives"
 "Turn" (video)

 UK CD2
 "Turn"
 "We Are Monkeys"
 "Baby One More Time" (live from the Bay Tavern, Robin Hood's Bay)

 UK cassette single
 "Turn"
 "Days of Our Lives"

 European CD single
 "Turn"
 "Baby One More Time" (live from the Bay Tavern, Robin Hood's Bay)

 US CD single
 "Turn" (radio edit)
 "Why Does It Always Rain on Me?"
 "Baby One More Time" (live from VH1 Storytellers)

 Japanese CD EP
 "Turn"
 "River"
 "Days of Our Lives"
 "We Are Monkeys"
 "Baby One More Time" (live from the Bay Tavern, Robin Hood's Bay)
 "Writing to Reach You" (video)
 "Driftwood" (video)
 "Why Does It Always Rain on Me?" (video)
 "Turn" (video)

Credits and personnel
Credits are lifted from the UK CD1 liner notes.

Studios
 Produced at Chateau de la Rouge Motte (Domfront en Poiraie, France) and Abbey Road (London, England)
 Mixed at Strongroom Studios (London, England)

Personnel
 Fran Healy – writing
 Mike Hedges – production
 Nigel Godrich – mixing
 Blue Source – art direction
 Stefan Ruiz – photography

Charts

References

1999 singles
1999 songs
Independiente (record label) singles
Rock ballads
Song recordings produced by Mike Hedges
Songs written by Fran Healy (musician)
Travis (band) songs